Vladimir Vovk is a British computer scientist, and professor at Royal Holloway University of London. He is the co-inventor of Conformal prediction. He is the co-director of the Centre for Machine Learning at Royal Holloway University of London, and a Fellow of the Royal Statistical Society.

Career
Vovk started working as a researcher in the Russian Academy of Sciences, then became a Fellow in the Center for Advanced Study in the Behavioral Sciences at Stanford University. He was appointed as a professor of Computer Science at Royal Holloway and Bedford New College, where he currently serves as co-director of the Centre for Machine Learning.

Early in his career, Vovk was heavily involved in the development of the foundations of probability, along with Glenn Shafer. Their work has resulted in a book, Probability and Finance: It's Only a Game!, published in 2001, which was subsequently translated into Japanese in 2006 by Masayuki Kumon and edited by Kei Takeuchi. In 2005, he co-invented the Conformal prediction framework with Alexander Gammerman.

Vovk has delivered speeches all around the world. In 2021, he was invited to deliver a series of memorial lectures to Prasanta Chandra Mahalanobis in India. On the 20-year anniversary of The Society for Imprecise Probability (SIPTA) in 2019, he was invited to deliver a talk on "Game-theoretic foundations for imprecise probabilities" in Belgium. In 2016, he delivered a seminar about "Probability-free theory of continuous martingales" at Imperial College in the UK. In 2014, he delivered a seminar at University of Hawai'i in the USA.

Vovk has written 9 books, more than 280 research papers, and has an estimated h-index of 53. He holds fellowship positions at Stanford University (USA), Arizona State University (USA) and Yandex (Russia).

Selected books
 Game-theoretic foundations for probability and finance (2019), Wiley, .
 Conformal Prediction for Reliable Machine Learning: Theory, Adaptations and Applications (2014), Morgan Kaufmann, .
 Algorithmic Learning in a Random World (2005), Springer, .
 Probability and finance: it's only a game (2001), Wiley, .

References

External links
 Vovk's Personal Website
 Vovk's University Website

Year of birth missing (living people)
Living people
Ukrainian emigrants to the United Kingdom
Fellows of the Royal Statistical Society
Academics of Royal Holloway, University of London
Moscow State University alumni
British computer scientists
Machine learning researchers
Mathematical statisticians